ڷ is an additional letter of the Arabic script, derived from lām (ل) with an additional three dots above the letter.  Though not used in the Arabic alphabet itself, it is used in the Brahui, Sawi, and Dhatki.  In Brahui, it is to represent a voiceless lateral fricative .  In Sawi, 'ڷ' represents the voiced palatal lateral approximant  as well as the voiceless lateral fricative .  In Dhatki, it represents the voiced retroflex lateral approximant  similar to Punjabi's لؕ and also represents the voiced retroflex lateral flap .

References 

S